Robert Raymond Sohl (March 28, 1928 – April 8, 2001) was an American competition swimmer and Olympic medalist.

Sohl represented the United States at the 1948 Summer Olympics in London, where he received a bronze medal for his third-place performance in the men's 200-meter breaststroke, finishing behind fellow Americans Joe Verdeur and Keith Carter, and completing an American sweep of the event.  Verdeur, Carter and Sohl had finished in the same order at the 1948 U.S. Olympic Trials. Although his time was recorded by the timekeepers to be 0.2s slower than the fourth-place finisher, John Davies of Australia, the judges believed that Sohl had touched first and awarded him the bronze. 

Sohl attended the University of Michigan, where he swam for the Michigan Wolverines swimming and diving team in National Collegiate Athletic Association (NCAA) competition from 1947 to 1949.

He died in Highland Beach, Florida in 2001, at the age of 73.

See also
 List of Olympic medalists in swimming (men)
 List of University of Michigan alumni

References

External links
 

1928 births
2001 deaths
American male breaststroke swimmers
Michigan Wolverines men's swimmers
Olympic bronze medalists for the United States in swimming
Swimmers at the 1948 Summer Olympics
Medalists at the 1948 Summer Olympics
People from York, Pennsylvania
People from Highland Beach, Florida